Ekkapan Jandakorn (born January 17, 1986), is a Thai former professional footballer who played as a defender for Trat.

Match fixing scandal and ban
On February 21, 2017 Ekkapan was accused of match-fixing on several league games. He was arrested by royal Thai police and banned from football for life.

References

External links
 Profile at Goal
http://th.soccerway.com/players/ekkapan-jandakorn/287684/

1986 births
Living people
Ekkapan Jandakorn
Ekkapan Jandakorn
Association football defenders
Ekkapan Jandakorn
Ekkapan Jandakorn
Ekkapan Jandakorn
Ekkapan Jandakorn